Rory van Vugt (born 8 October 1997) is a New Zealand rugby union player, who currently plays as a wing or fullback for the  in Super Rugby and  in New Zealand's domestic National Provincial Championship competition.

He previously played for Rugby ATL in Major League Rugby (MLR).

In 2019, van Vugt was named as a player to watch by allblacks.com.

References

1997 births
Living people
New Zealand people of Dutch descent
People educated at South Otago High School
New Zealand rugby union players
Rugby union players from Balclutha, New Zealand
Rugby union fullbacks
Rugby union wings
Southland rugby union players
Rugby ATL players
Highlanders (rugby union) players